Ibrahim Camejo Sayas (also Ibrain Camejo Zayas, born 28 June 1982) is a Cuban long jumper.

He won the bronze medals at the 2005 Central American and Caribbean Championships and the 2006 Central American and Caribbean Games. He then won the more prestigious bronze medal at the 2008 Olympic Games. He also competed at the 2005 World Championships without reaching the final round.

Personal bests 
His personal best jump is 8.46 metres, achieved in June 2008 in Bilbao.

Competition record

References

External links

Tilastopaja biography

1982 births
Living people
Cuban male long jumpers
Athletes (track and field) at the 2008 Summer Olympics
Olympic athletes of Cuba
Olympic bronze medalists for Cuba
Medalists at the 2008 Summer Olympics
Olympic bronze medalists in athletics (track and field)
Central American and Caribbean Games bronze medalists for Cuba
Competitors at the 2006 Central American and Caribbean Games
Central American and Caribbean Games medalists in athletics
People from Isla de la Juventud